Wesley Mann (born September 6, 1963) is an American character actor, best known for his role as the caterpillar on Adventures in Wonderland and for playing the spluttering teacher-turned-principal Mr. Lawler on That's So  Raven.

Many of Mann's roles are minor and he frequently delivers only a handful of lines, but he has a somewhat distinctive appearance, that of a long-suffering, vaguely glib demeanor that makes him easily recognizable whenever he shows up in a film or on television. He is, by definition, a character actor, and thus he has never performed a lead role.

His acting career began in the early 1980s, landing guest roles on mainstay sitcoms The Golden Girls and Night Court, and appearances in Who's Harry Crumb? and My Stepmother Is An Alien. His distinctive face and demeanor were featured prominently in 1989's Back to the Future Part II, as the high school student who thinks that Marty has just robbed Biff of his wallet. As Biff regains consciousness after having been knocked out by George, Mann (credited as "CPR Kid," but later labeled by fans as the Wallet Guy) shouts "I think he took your wallet!" after Biff, then turns back to the other onlookers and repeats "I think he took his wallet."

Mann has also appeared in the Hudson Valley Shakespeare Festival in Garrison, New York, for nine seasons.

Filmography

Film

Television

Video Games

External links
 

1959 births
Living people
American male film actors
American male television actors
American male voice actors
20th-century American male actors
21st-century American male actors
Male actors from the San Francisco Bay Area
Actors from Vallejo, California